Yauheni Novikau (born May 4, 1996) is a Belarusian male acrobatic gymnast. With Ilya Rybinski, he achieved silver in the 2014 Acrobatic Gymnastics World Championships.

References

External links

 

1996 births
Living people
Belarusian acrobatic gymnasts
Male acrobatic gymnasts
Medalists at the Acrobatic Gymnastics World Championships